Tobruk Air Transport and Cargo, commonly known as Tobruk Air, was a cargo airline based in Libya.

Fleet
 Boeing 707
 Antonov An-24
 Ilyushin Il-76

Defunct airlines of Libya
Cargo airlines